The first season of The Masked Singer based on the Masked Singer franchise which originated from the South Korean version of the show King of Mask Singer. It premiered on VTM on 18 September 2020, and is hosted by Niels Destadsbader.  The season was won by singer Sandra Kim as "Queen", with actor-singer Giovanni Kemper finishing second as "Diver", and actor Kevin Janssens placing third as "Wolf".

The season was very successful with every episode having more than 1 million viewers. The final made a record with having more than 2 million viewers, giving broadcoaster VTM the highest rating in more than 20 years. One of the highlights of this season was the instant recognition by panelist Damen of her ex-colleague Aerts. Their reunion after the unmasking of Aerts even made headlines in the Netherlands.

Because of the high ratings, the show was renewed for a second season.

Cast

Panelists and host
Niels Destadsbader was the host of the series. Jens Dendoncker, Julie Van den Steen and Karen Damen were permanent members of the panel. In every episode, there was another guest judge. 

Karen Damen guessed eight out of ten contestants correctly, making her the highest scoring judge. Julie Van den Steen only managed to guess three contestants. Jens Dendocker didn't guess any of the contestants.

Contestants

Episodes

Episode 1 (18 September)

Episode 2 (25 September) 
A new contestant "Mermaid" enters the competition.

Episode 3 (2 October) 
A new contestant "Candyfloss" enters the competition.

Episode 4 (9 October)

Episode 5 (16 October) 
In this episode, only one of the masked singers at risk was saved from elimination by the judges. The bottom two contestants went up against each other in a sing-off.  The audience chose the winner, the runner-up was unmasked.

Episode 6 (23 October) 
Each contestant performed a song. Two contestants were saved from elimination by the audience, one contestant was saved by the judges. The remaining two contestants went up against each other in a sing-off. The audience chose the winner, the runner-up was unmasked.

Episode 7 (30 October) 
Each contestant performed two songs. Two contestants were saved from elimination by the judges, one contestant was saved by the audience. The remaining contestant was unmasked.

Episode 8 (6 November) - Finale 
After each contestant performed two songs, two of them were saved by the audience and the third one was unmasked.  The remaining two contestants went up against each other in a sing-off. The audience chose the winner, after which both the runner-up and the winner were unmasked.

Ratings
Official ratings are taken from CIM, which includes viewers who watched the programme within 7 days of the original broadcoast.

See also

The Masked Singer franchise

References

External links
 

Masked Singer
2020 television seasons